Rajesh Kumar Mishra is a politician from Varanasi, India. He served as a member of the 14th Lok Sabha from Varanasi. He was also a candidate for 2022 Uttar Pradesh Legislative Assembly election in the seat of  Varansi Cantonment.

Personal life 
He was born on 7 July 1950, in Deoria, Uttar Pradesh, and married Madhu Mishra in 1983.

Reference 

Living people
People from Deoria, Uttar Pradesh
1950 births
India MPs 2004–2009
Indian National Congress politicians from Uttar Pradesh